Latgalian may refer to:

 Something of or relating to Latgale, a region in eastern Latvia
 Latgalians, an ancient Baltic tribe
 Latgalians (modern), the modern inhabitants of Latgale
 Latgalian language, the language spoken in that region

Language and nationality disambiguation pages